Josephus Antonius van Kemenade (6 March 1937 – 19 February 2020) was a Dutch politician of the Labour Party (PvdA) and sociologist. He was granted the honorary title of Minister of State on 5 April 2002.

Life and career
Van Kemenade was born in Amsterdam. He attended a Gymnasium in Amsterdam from June 1949 until 1955 and applied at the Radboud University Nijmegen in June 1955 majoring in Sociology and obtaining a Bachelor of Social Science degree in June 1957 and worked as a student researcher before graduating with a Master of Social Science degree in May 1960. Van Kemenade worked as a researcher at the Radboud University Nijmegen from May 1960 until January 1965 and was director of the Institute for Social Sciences from 1 January 1965 until 11 May 1973. Van Kemenade returned to the Radboud University Nijmegen in July 1964 for a postgraduate education in Sociology where he got a doctorate as a Doctor of Philosophy in Sociology on 10 May 1968. Van Kemenade worked as a professor of Pedagogy at the Radboud University Nijmegen from 1 January 1970 until 11 May 1973.

After the election of 1972 Van Kemenade was appointed as Minister of Education and Sciences in the Cabinet Den Uyl, taking office on 11 May 1973. The Cabinet Den Uyl fell on 22 March 1977 and continued to serve in a demissionary capacity. Van Kemenade was elected as a Member of the House of Representatives after the election of 1977, taking office on 8 June 1977 but he was still serving in the cabinet, and because of dualism customs in the constitutional convention of Dutch politics, he couldn't serve a dual mandate so he subsequently resigned as a Member of the House of Representatives on 8 September 1977. The Cabinet Den Uyl was replaced by the Cabinet Van Agt–Wiegel following the cabinet formation of 1977 on 11 May 1973 and he subsequently returned as Member of the House of Representatives after the resignation of Frits Niessen, taking office on 16 January 1978 serving as a frontbencher and spokesperson for Education, Science and Technology. Van Kemenade also returned as a distinguished professor of Pedagogy at the University of Groningen from 1 May 1978 until 11 September 1981. After the election of 1981 Van Kemenade was again appointed as Minister of Education and Sciences in the Cabinet Van Agt II, taking office on 11 September 1981. The Cabinet Van Agt II fell just seven months into its term on 12 May 1982 and continued to serve in a demissionary capacity until it was replaced by the caretaker Cabinet Van Agt III on 29 May 1982. After the election of 1982 Van Kemenade again returned as a Member of the House of Representatives, taking office on 16 September 1982 serving as a frontbencher chairing the parliamentary committee on Education and Science and the parliamentary committee on Kingdom Relations. Van Kemenade also returned as a distinguished professor of Pedagogy at the University of Amsterdam from 1 July 1982 until 1 September 1984.

In September 1984 Van Kemenade was nominated as the President of the University council of the University of Amsterdam, he resigned as a Member of the House of Representatives the same day he was installed as President of the university council on 1 September 1984. Van Kemenade also served as a distinguished professor of Pedagogy at the Open University from 1 February 1987 until 1 February 1995. In February 1988 Van Kemenade was nominated as Mayor of Eindhoven, he resigned as President of the university council the same day he was installed as Mayor, taking office on 1 March 1988. In February 1992 Van Kemenade was nominated as the Queen's Commissioner of North Holland, he resigned as Mayor the same day he was installed as Queen's Commissioner, serving from 1 May 1992 until 1 April 2002. Van Kemenade also became active in the public sector and occupied numerous seats as a nonprofit director on several boards of directors and supervisory boards (Institute for Multiparty Democracy, Organisation for Scientific Research, Transnational Institute, Parliamentary Documentation Center, International Institute of Social History, ProDemos, Foundation for Academic Heritage, International Society for Comparative Adult Education, T.M.C. Asser Instituut, Anne Frank Foundation, and the Royal Academy of Arts and Sciences) and served on several state commissions and councils on behalf of the government (Council for Public Administration, Public Pension Funds APB, Council for Culture and the Cadastre Agency. Van Kemenade also served as a distinguished visiting professor of Sociology at the University of Amsterdam from 1 March 2000 until 1 May 2002. Van Kemenade was also a prolific author, having written more than a dozen books since 1970 about Politics and Education.

Van Kemenade was known for his abilities as a consensus builder and policy wonk. Van Kemenade died on 19 February 2020. He continued to comment on political affairs as a statesman until his death.

Decorations

References

External links

Official
  Dr. J.A. (Jos) van Kemenade Parlement & Politiek

1937 births
2020 deaths
Commanders of the Order of Orange-Nassau
Commanders of the Order of the Netherlands Lion
Dutch academic administrators
Dutch educational theorists
Dutch magazine editors
Dutch memoirists
Dutch nonprofit directors
Dutch nonprofit executives
Dutch political writers
Dutch Roman Catholics
Dutch sociologists
Grand Officiers of the Légion d'honneur
Knights Commander of the Order of Merit of the Federal Republic of Germany
Knights Commander with Star of the Order of St. Gregory the Great
Knights Grand Cross of the Order of Isabella the Catholic
Knights of the Holy Sepulchre
Labour Party (Netherlands) politicians
Mayors of Eindhoven
Members of the House of Representatives (Netherlands)
Members of the Royal Netherlands Academy of Arts and Sciences
Ministers of Education of the Netherlands
Ministers of State (Netherlands)
Politicians from Amsterdam
People from Heiloo
King's and Queen's Commissioners of North Holland
Radboud University Nijmegen alumni
Academic staff of Radboud University Nijmegen
Recipients of the Grand Cross of the Order of Leopold II
Sociologists of education
Academic staff of the University of Amsterdam
Academic staff of the University of Groningen
20th-century Dutch civil servants
20th-century Dutch educators
20th-century Dutch male writers
20th-century Dutch politicians
21st-century Dutch civil servants
21st-century Dutch male writers
21st-century Dutch politicians